Ibram Lassaw (May 4, 1913 – December 30, 2003) was a Russian-American sculptor, known for non-objective construction in brazed metals.

Biography
Lassaw was born in Alexandria, Egypt, of Russian émigré parents, he went to the U.S. in 1921. His family settled in Brooklyn, New York. He became a US citizen in 1928. He first studied sculpture in 1926 at the Clay Club and later at the Beaux-Arts Institute of Design in New York. He made abstract paintings and drawings influenced by Kandinsky, Sophie Taeuber-Arp, and other artists. He also attended the City College of New York.

Influenced by his study of art history and readings in European art magazines, Lassaw began to make sculpture in the late 1920s. He was among the "small group of artists committed themselves to abstract art during the 1930s." In his work, Ibram Lassaw "replaced the monolithic solidity of cast metal with open-space constructions obtained by welding."

During the mid-1930s, Lassaw worked briefly for the Public Works of Art Project cleaning sculptural monuments around New York City. He subsequently joined the WPA as a teacher and sculptor until he was drafted into the army in 1942. Lassaw's contribution to the advancement of sculptural abstraction went beyond mere formal innovation; his promotion of modernist styles during the 1930s did much to insure the growth of abstract art in the United States. He was one of the founding members of the American Abstract Artists group, and served as president of the American Abstract Artists organization from 1946 to 1949.

Lassaw is a sculptor who was a part of the  New York School of Abstract expressionism during the 1940s and 1950s. Jackson Pollock, Lee Krasner, James Brooks, John Ferren, Willem de Kooning, and several other artists like Lassaw spent summers on the Southern Shore of Long Island. Lassaw spent summers on Long Island from 1955 until he moved there permanently in 1963.

His work has been exhibited in galleries, including the Anita Shapolsky Gallery in New York City and Harmon Meek Gallery in Naples, Florida.

See also
Abstract expressionism
New York School

Sources
John Lynch, Metal sculpture; new forms, new techniques p. 99; p. 135
Scultura in America (Roma : Edizioni della cometa, 1990.) p. 73–82
200 years of American sculpture (New York: David R. Godine in association with the Whitney Museum of American Art, ©1976.) p. 181; p. 183; p. 184; p. 286

References

External links
artcyclopedia
ro gallery bio
American Abstract Artists
Ibram Lassaw Exhibition in Matera, Italy; Sculptures and works on paper 1913–2003

American people of Egyptian-Jewish descent
Egyptian Ashkenazi Jews
Jewish sculptors
Jewish American artists
American people of Russian-Jewish descent
Abstract expressionist artists
Public Works of Art Project artists
Egyptian emigrants to the United States
Egyptian people of Russian descent
People from Brooklyn
Artists from New York City
Artists from Alexandria
20th-century American sculptors
20th-century male artists
American male sculptors
1913 births
2003 deaths
Burials at Green River Cemetery
Sculptors from New York (state)
Beaux-Arts Institute of Design (New York City) alumni
20th-century American Jews
21st-century American Jews
Members of the American Academy of Arts and Letters